The Decline of Western Civilization is a 1981 American documentary filmed through 1979 and 1980. The movie is about the Los Angeles punk rock scene and was directed by Penelope Spheeris. In 1981, the LAPD Chief of Police Daryl Gates wrote a letter demanding the film not be shown again in the city.

The film's title is possibly a reference to music critic Lester Bangs' 1970 two-part review of the Stooges' album Fun House, for Creem magazine, where Bangs quotes a friend who had said the popularity of the Stooges signaled "the decline of Western civilization". Another possibility is that the title refers to Darby Crash's reading of Oswald Spengler's Der Untergang des Abendlandes (The Decline of the West). In We Got the Neutron Bomb, an oral history of the L.A. punk rock scene collected by Marc Spitz, Claude Bessy aka: Kickboy, claims that he came up with the title.

The film is the opening act of a trilogy by Spheeris, depicting music scenes in Los Angeles during the late 20th century. The second film, The Decline of Western Civilization Part II: The Metal Years (1988), covers the Los Angeles heavy metal scene of 1987–1988. The third film, The Decline of Western Civilization Part III (1998), chronicles the gutter punk lifestyle of homeless teenagers in the late 1990s.

In 2016, The Decline of Western Civilization was selected by the Library of Congress for preservation in the United States National Film Registry, being deemed "culturally, historically, or aesthetically significant".

Plot
Featuring concert footage of Los Angeles punk bands and interviews both with band members, the publishers of Slash fanzine, and with the punks who made up their audience, the film offers a look into a subculture that was largely ignored by the rock music press of the time.

The promotional poster for The Decline (and the record cover of the soundtrack album) featured a close-up frame of Germs singer Darby Crash supine on stage with his eyes closed. Crash died from a heroin-induced suicide shortly before the film was released (the poster was designed before his death).

Bands included are Black Flag, Germs, X, Alice Bag Band, the Circle Jerks, Catholic Discipline, and Fear. The Germs' performance was replicated in the 2007 Darby Crash biopic What We Do Is Secret.

Performances
 Alice Bag Band
 "Gluttony"
 "Prowlers in the Night"
 Black Flag
 "Depression"
 "Revenge"
 "White Minority"
 Circle Jerks
 "Back Against the Wall"
 "Beverly Hills"
 "I Just Want Some Skank"
 "Red Tape"
 "Wasted"
 Catholic Discipline
 "Barbee Doll Lust"
 "Underground Babylon"
 Fear
 "Beef Bologna"
 "I Don't Care About You"
 "I Love Livin' in the City"
 "Let's Have a War"
 "Fear Anthem"
 Germs
 "Manimal"
 "Shutdown"
 X
 "Beyond and Back"
 "Johnny Hit and Run Paulene"
 "Nausea"
 "Unheard Music"
 "We're Desperate"

Soundtrack

The soundtrack was released in December 1980 by Slash Records on LP. In the late 1990s it was released on CD as well. Germs singer Darby Crash appears on the soundtrack album cover. He died shortly before the film was released, though the promotional images for the film and album release had been designed before his death.

References

External links
 
 
 
 

1981 films
American documentary films
Films directed by Penelope Spheeris
Documentary films about punk music and musicians
Punk films
1981 soundtrack albums
Slash Records soundtracks
1981 documentary films
Documentary films about Los Angeles
Music of Los Angeles
United States National Film Registry films
Documentary film soundtracks
1981 directorial debut films
X (American band)
1980s English-language films
1980s American films